Frank Salisbury is the name of:

 Frank O. Salisbury (1874–1962), English artist
 Frank B. Salisbury (1926–2015), American plant physiologist
 Frank Salisbury Harris, acting mayor of Albany, New York, 1944–1945